Muğla halkası (Hıdırellez Halkası)(Turkish: Muğla halkası or Hıdırellez Halkası) is a kind of Turkish cookie that is made from, olive oil, baking powder, yogurt, egg, lemon juice and flour.

See also
Acıbadem kurabiyesi
Osmania Biscuit
Köylü pastası

References

Turkish pastries
Cookies
Shortbread